The Battle of Luith Feirn took place within the Pictish kingdom of Fortriu in 664. It is recorded in the Annals of Ulster as "Bellum Lutho Feirnn, .i. iFortrinn." meaning "The Battle of Luith Feirnn, i.e. in Fortriu.". This is the first explicit mention of Fortriu in contemporary Irish chronicles, though the cognate Verturiones had been mentioned by the Roman writer Ammianus Marcellinus in the late 4th century as one of the Pictish peoples participating in the Barbarian Conspiracy of 367–368.

The participants in the battle are unrecorded, but it may be connected to the accession of the king of Fortriu Drest son of Donuel, after the death of his brother Gartnait son of Donuel in 663.

The location of Luith Feirn, meaning "alder-gate", is not known for certain; but places called Leitirfearn and Leitir Fearna, meaning "alder-hillside" exist on the south side of Loch Oich in the Great Glen, so it's possible that the battle site was nearby.

References

Bibliography

 
 
 

660s conflicts
664
7th century in Scotland
Battles involving the Picts